Samira Bellil (24 November 1972 – 4 September 2004) was a French feminist activist and a campaigner for the rights of girls and women.

Bellil became famous in France with the publication of her autobiographical book Dans l'enfer des tournantes ('In the hell of the "tournantes" (gang-rapes) in 2002. The book discusses the violence she and other young women endured in the predominantly North African and Arab immigrant outskirts of Paris, where she was repeatedly gang-raped as a teenager by gangs led by people she knew, and then abandoned by her family and friends.

The book is available in English (translated by Lucy R. McNair) as To Hell and Back: The Life of Samira Bellil.

Life 

Bellil was born to Algerian parents in Algiers, but her family migrated to France and settled in the Parisian suburb of Val-d'Oise. Her father was jailed almost immediately for murder and she was fostered by a family in Belgium for five years, before being called back to her parents.

As a teenager Bellil rebelled against the traditional constraints of her community and wanted to live freely as a young French woman.

Samira was first gang-raped when she was 14, by a gang led by someone she knew. They beat her viciously and raped her all night. A month later, one of the most violent attackers in the gang followed her and dragged her off a train by her hair, while other passengers looked the other way. She was then brutally raped by him again.

She did not report her rapes until two friends told her that the same gang had sexually assaulted them too. Samira decided to appeal to the French legal system to prosecute her attackers. In the end, the ring leader of the gang was sentenced to eight years in prison.

Bellil's parents, who believed they were shamed by her presence, expelled her from her house as she did not practice 'modesty' and chose not to veil herself with a hijab. "People outside the community don't know," Bellil has written. "And everyone in the community knows, but they won't say anything."

Eventually, she found a psychologist who helped her. She had years of therapy, and describes how she decided to write her book to show other young women gang-rape victims that there was a way out. "It's long and it's difficult, but it's possible," she wrote in the dedication - to "my sisters in trouble". She used her real name and put her photo on the cover. She dedicated the book to her "girlfriends, so that they realize that one can overcome the traumatic" and to Boris Cyrulnik, her therapist. Her experience shocked France and forced the government to look into the issue.

She later became a youth worker. She died on 4 September 2004 of stomach cancer. She was 31.

Ni Putes Ni Soumises  
Bellil helped found a young women's activist group called Ni Putes Ni Soumises ("Neither whores nor submissives") which has publicly addressed the issue of violence against young women in France. The group drew the attention of the French and European press as they organized marches and press conferences to bring attention to the tragic events happening to young women in the banlieue of France. She denounced the gang-rapes (known as tournantes, or "pass-arounds") and described how she overcame both her traumatic experiences and the need for revenge.

Legacy

She was chosen as one of the new Mariannes, the new faces of France. Her portrait hangs outside the French National Assembly.

In 2005 a French school in l’Île-Saint-Denis was named in her honor: Ecole Samira Bellil.

References

External links 
 CBS News: Article on Samira Bellil
 Time Magazine: Sisters In Hell
 The Guardian: Gang rape on rise among French youth
 Reuters: Girls terrorized in France’s macho ghettos
 The Guardian: Article on Samira Bellil
 BBC News: France in shock over gang rape
 The Australian: Tournantes in Australia
 Sydney Morning Herald: Muslim gang rapes in Sydney Australia
 CNN Transcript: Muslim Women Rebel In France
 ABC News: Paris gang rape trial begins
 Book review Neither whores nor submissives and In gang-rape hell
 Vanity Fair: Daughters of France, Daughters of Allah
 Newsweek: Sexism in the cités
 IBC: Remembering Samira Bellil

Studies on the Phenomena of Tournantes
 Tournantes Documented cases in Paris In French
 "Tournantes : un phénomène international" French study on the tournante phenomenon in several countries, zipped pdf file
 'No surprise' over group rape findings

1972 births
2004 deaths
Algerian emigrants to France
Deaths from stomach cancer
French activists
French women activists
People from Algiers
French women's rights activists
Algerian women writers
Algerian writers
Deaths from cancer in France
Sexual abuse victim advocates
Burials at Père Lachaise Cemetery
Gang rape in Europe
Violence against women in France
20th-century French women